Giuseppe Visenzi (born 22 January 1941 in Brescia) is an Italian former Grand Prix motorcycle road racer. His best year was in 1969 when he finished third in the 350cc world championship, behind Giacomo Agostini and Silvio Grassetti.

Givi 

The motorcycle accessories company founded by Visenzi in 1978.

References 

1941 births
Sportspeople from Brescia
Living people
Italian motorcycle racers
125cc World Championship riders
250cc World Championship riders
350cc World Championship riders